Karim Onisiwo (born 17 March 1992) is an Austrian professional footballer who plays as a forward for Bundesliga club Mainz 05 and the Austria national team.

International career
Onisiwo was born in Austria to a Nigerian father and Austrian mother. He made his debut for the senior Austria squad as a substitute, in a friendly against Switzerland in November 2015.

Club career
He joined German side FSV Mainz 05 in 2016 . He scored his first hat-trick for the club in January 2023 in a game versus VfL Bochum .

Career statistics

Club

International

International goals

Scores and results list Austria's goal tally first, score column indicates score after each Onisiwo goal.

References

External links

 Profile at the 1. FSV Mainz 05 website 
 
 
 

1992 births
Living people
Association football forwards
Austrian footballers
Austria under-21 international footballers
Austria international footballers
Austrian people of Nigerian descent
SV Austria Salzburg players
SV Mattersburg players
1. FSV Mainz 05 players
1. FSV Mainz 05 II players
Austrian Football Bundesliga players
2. Liga (Austria) players
Austrian Regionalliga players
Bundesliga players
3. Liga players
UEFA Euro 2020 players
Austrian expatriate footballers
Austrian expatriate sportspeople in Germany
Expatriate footballers in Germany
Footballers from Vienna